Rhadinophylla is a genus of moths in the family Gelechiidae.

Species
Rhadinophylla siderosema Turner, 1919

References

Dichomeridinae